In geometry, a 257-gon is a polygon with 257 sides. The sum of the interior angles of any non-self-intersecting 257-gon is 45,900°.

Regular 257-gon 
The area of a regular 257-gon is (with )

A whole regular 257-gon is not visually discernible from a circle, and its perimeter differs from that of the circumscribed circle by about 24 parts per million.

Construction 
The regular 257-gon (one with all sides equal and all angles equal) is of interest for being a constructible polygon: that is, it can be constructed using a compass and an unmarked straightedge. This is because 257 is a Fermat prime, being of the form 22n + 1 (in this case n = 3).

Although it was known to Gauss by 1801 that the regular 257-gon was constructible, the first explicit constructions of a regular 257-gon were given by Magnus Georg Paucker (1822) and Friedrich Julius Richelot (1832). Another method involves the use of 150 circles, 24 being Carlyle circles: this method is pictured below. One of these Carlyle circles solves the quadratic equation x2 + x − 64 = 0.

Symmetry 
The regular 257-gon has Dih257 symmetry, order 514. Since 257 is a prime number there is one subgroup with dihedral symmetry: Dih1, and 2 cyclic group symmetries: Z257, and Z1.

257-gram
A 257-gram is a 257-sided star polygon.

Below is a view of {257/128}, with 257 nearly radial edges, with its star vertex internal angles 180°/257 (~0.7°).

See also
17-gon

References

External links

Robert Dixon Mathographics. New York: Dover, p. 53, 1991.
Benjamin Bold, Famous Problems of Geometry and How to Solve Them. New York: Dover, p. 70, 1982. 
H. S. M. Coxeter Introduction to Geometry, 2nd ed. New York: Wiley, 1969. Chapter 2, Regular polygons
Leonard Eugene Dickson Constructions with Ruler and Compasses; Regular Polygons. Ch. 8 in Monographs on Topics of Modern Mathematics *Relevant to the Elementary Field (Ed. J. W. A. Young). New York: Dover, pp. 352–386, 1955.
257-gon, exact construction the 1st side using the quadratrix according of Hippias as an additional aid (German)

Constructible polygons
Polygons by the number of sides
Euclidean plane geometry
Carl Friedrich Gauss